Seminole Canyon, a valley and a stream in Val Verde County, Texas. Its mouth lies at an elevation of 1119 feet (341). The Seminole Canyon Creek has its source to the east of the rail line, on a mountainside  at an elevation of 1740 feet.

References

Landforms of Val Verde County, Texas